Krzyżówka may refer to the following places:
Krzyżówka, Gniezno County in Greater Poland Voivodeship (west-central Poland)
Krzyżówka, Lesser Poland Voivodeship (south Poland)
Krzyżówka, Masovian Voivodeship (east-central Poland)